Masterji is a 1985 Indian Hindi-language romantic comedy film directed by K. Raghavendra Rao and written by K. Bhagyaraj. The film stars Rajesh Khanna and Sridevi. It is a remake of Bhagyaraj's own Tamil film Mundhanai Mudichu (1983).

In the film, Radha falls in love with the new teacher employed in the village school. Being a widower with a son, he snubs her. In response, she publicly accuses him of having an affair with her. The film was released theatrically on 30 August 1985.It was one of the highest grossing Bollywood movie of 1985.

Plot
Radha (Sridevi) is a notorious prankster creating a variety of mischiefs along with her gang, which often end up in the village court. Masterji (Rajesh Khanna) enters the village with his infant child to take up the vacant teacher post in the local school, but isn't spared from Radha's pranks upon his arrival. He takes up the job with one hand holding the book, and the other rocking the cradle in the classroom much to the amusement of local folk in the village. Radha's playful nature transforms into love when she learns that he's a widower. She tries many ways to win the teacher's heart, but fails every time. The teacher believes that a stepmother would not take care of his child, and thus even rejects the offer to marry his dead wife's sister. As a last hope to attain him, Radha blames the teacher for molesting her and even swears on it by crossing over his child in front of the village court. Petrified, and with the whole village surrounded, he is left with very little option than to marry her. But vows never to touch her and remain in celibacy. But Radha doesn't give. She relentlessly tries to seduce him by unconventional methods that prove to be testing times for the teacher. With the chances of winning him slowly decreasing, Radha comes to a conclusion once and for all.

Cast
 Rajesh Khanna as Raju
 Sridevi as Radha
 Anita Raj as Shobha
 Kader Khan as Jamnadas
 Shakti Kapoor as Bholashankar
 Aruna Irani as Roopa
 Asrani as Pandit
 Shyama as Shanti
 Om Shivpuri as Vaid
 Jayshree Gadkar as Masterji's Mother-in-law

Production 

Soundtrack

Box office
Masterji was a super hit at box-office, according to Trade Guide. It has grossed appx 8 crores in 1985

References

External links
 

1985 films
Indian romantic comedy-drama films
1980s romantic comedy-drama films
1985 drama films
1980s Hindi-language films
Films directed by K. Raghavendra Rao
Hindi remakes of Tamil films
Films scored by Bappi Lahiri
Films about educators
Films set in schools